Richard Lewis Hart (March 19, 1927 – February 18, 1991) was an American long-distance runner. He competed in the men's 10,000 metres at the 1956 Summer Olympics.

References

External links
 

1927 births
1991 deaths
Athletes (track and field) at the 1956 Summer Olympics
American male long-distance runners
Olympic track and field athletes of the United States
Place of birth missing
20th-century American people